Starscream can be:

Starscream (Transformers), a character from the Transformers franchise.

Starscream can also refer to:
DJ Starscream, a stage name of DJ Sid Wilson.

es:Starscream
fr:Starscream
id:Starscream
it:Astrum (Transformers)
hu:Üstökös (Transformers)
ja:スタースクリーム
pl:Starscream
pt:Starscream
ru:Скандалист (трансформер)
sr:Старскрим
fi:Starscream
zh:星星叫